Mimipochira is a genus of beetles in the family Cerambycidae. It contains the following species:

 Mimipochira fruhstorferi Breuning, 1956
 Mimipochira sikkimensis (Breuning, 1977)

References

Acanthocinini